Digitivalva amseli is a moth of the family Acrolepiidae. It was described by Reinhard Gaedike in 1975. It is found in Afghanistan.

References

Moths described in 1975
Acrolepiidae